Ismaïla Sarr (born 25 February 1998) is a Senegalese professional footballer who plays as a winger for EFL Championship club Watford and the Senegal national team.

Club career

Early career
Born in Saint-Louis, Senegal, Sarr started his football career with Senegalese football club Génération Foot.

Metz
On 13 July 2016, Sarr signed his first professional contract with FC Metz for five years. He made his league debut on 13 August 2016 against Lille OSC at Stade Saint-Symphorien, the FC Metz's home ground, which Metz won by 3–2. In this match, he played 20 minutes, after he was substituted for Florent Mollet.

Stade Rennais
On 26 July 2017, Sarr signed a four-year contract with Ligue 1 side Rennes. The transfer fee paid to Metz was reported as €17 or 20 million, depending on the source. He picked the transfer to Rennes over a move to FC Barcelona.

On 13 December 2018, Sarr scored twice in the second half (including a penalty), as Rennes clinched their place in the 2018–19 UEFA Europa League knockout phase with a (Group K, Matchday 6) 2–0 home win over FC Astana.

Watford
On 8 August 2019, Sarr joined Premier League club Watford on a five-year contract. The transfer fee paid to Rennes was a club record for Watford and reported as "in the region of £30 million. He scored his first goal for Watford in an EFL Cup tie against Coventry City on 27 August 2019.

On 29 February 2020, Sarr picked up two goals and an assist in Watford's 3–0 home victory over defending UEFA Champions League winners Liverpool, handing them their first defeat of the 2019–20 season and ending the club's 44-match unbeaten league run.

On 24 April 2021, Sarr scored from the penalty spot in Watford’s 1–0 home win over Millwall in the Championship, sealing Watford’s return to the Premier League after one season.
Sarr ended as Watford’s top scorer for the 2020–21 season, scoring thirteen goals.

He continued from where he left off as he scored in Watford's 3–2 win against Aston Villa in their opening game of the 2021–22 Premier League season.

International career
Sarr has represented his country with the Senegal U23 national team. In 2015, he played in 2015 Africa U-23 Cup of Nations. At that time, his age was only 17. He contributed that Senegal finished the competition in a fourth place, playing three games.

He played for the first time with Senegal national team for a match against Namibia in September 2016 in Dakar (2–0) for 2017 Africa Cup of Nations qualification, for which Senegal had already qualified. As a symbol, he came into play in the 67th minute in place of the former resident of Génération Foot and Metz, Sadio Mané. On 8 January 2017, Sarr scored his first international goal in a friendly match against Libya in Stade Municipal de Kintélé, Brazzaville.

In May 2018, he was named in Senegal's 23-man squad for the 2018 FIFA World Cup in Russia.

In 2019, Sarr was part of the Senegal squad that reached the final of the Africa Cup of Nations, for only the second time in the nation's history. He played the full 90 minutes of the final on 19 July 2019, as they lost 1–0 to Algeria.

In November 2019, he suffered an ankle injury whilst on international duty.

Career statistics

Club

International

Scores and results list Senegal's goal tally first.

Honours
Rennes
 Coupe de France: 2018–19

Senegal
 African Cup of Nations: 2021; runner-up: 2019

Individual
 UEFA Europa League Goal of the Season: 2018–19

References

External links

LFP profile

1998 births
Living people
Sportspeople from Saint-Louis, Senegal
Senegalese footballers
Association football midfielders
Génération Foot players
FC Metz players
Stade Rennais F.C. players
Watford F.C. players
Ligue 1 players
Premier League players
Senegal international footballers
2015 Africa U-23 Cup of Nations players
2017 Africa Cup of Nations players
2018 FIFA World Cup players
2019 Africa Cup of Nations players
2021 Africa Cup of Nations players
2022 FIFA World Cup players
Africa Cup of Nations-winning players
Senegalese expatriate footballers
Senegalese expatriate sportspeople in France
Senegalese expatriate sportspeople in England
Expatriate footballers in France
Expatriate footballers in England
English Football League players